Nesticella marapu is an eyeless spider from Sumba, Indonesia. It has long legs and weak pigmentation. It is distinguished by all other species in the genus Nesticella by the beak-shaped paracymbium.

The species is of a bright yellow color, with a body length of less than 3mm, males being a bit smaller.
Of the eyes, not even eye sockets are visible.

It is only known from the 3 km long Marro cave close to Kabalidana, west of Waimangura.

Name
The species name marapu is derived from the Sumbanese spirit of ancestors Marapu.

References

 Benjamin, S.P. (2004). Nesticella marapu sp. n., a blind nesticid (Araneae: Nesticidae) from Sumba, Indonesia. Rev. suisse Zool. 111:303-307. PDF

Nesticidae
Spiders of Asia
Spiders described in 2004
Cave spiders